Justin Savi (born 30 October 1984) is a Beninese professional boxer who goes by the nickname of "Le Malin" (The Bad Guy). His professional record includes 24 fights: 24 wins (16 knockouts). He lives in Cotonou, Benin. On April 16, 2010, he won the first ever WBC silver world title against French boxer Cyril Thomas who quit after 7 rounds.

He also won the IBF Mediterranean featherweight title in 2008 and the ABU featherweight title in 2012.

External links 

Living people
1984 births
Beninese male boxers
Featherweight boxers
Super-featherweight boxers
African Boxing Union champions
People from Cotonou